The 2023 Seattle Mariners season will be the 47th season in franchise history. The Mariners are playing their 24th full season (25th overall) at T-Mobile Park, their home ballpark in Seattle, Washington.

Offseason

Rule changes 
Pursuant to the CBA, new rule changes will be in place for the 2023 season:

 institution of a pitch clock between pitches;
 limits on pickoff attempts per plate appearance;
 limits on defensive shifts requiring two infielders to be on either side of second and be within the boundary of the infield; and
 larger bases (increased to 18-inch squares);

Regular season

Game log

|- style="background: 
| 1 || March 30 || Guardians || – || || || — || || – ||
|- style="background: 
| 2 || March 31 || Guardians || – || || || — || || – ||
|- style="background: 
| 3 || April 1 || Guardians || – || || || — || || – ||
|- style="background: 
| 4 || April 2 || Guardians || – || || || — || || – ||
|- style="background: 
| 5 || April 3 || Angels || – || || || — || || – ||
|- style="background: 
| 6 || April 4 || Angels || – || || || — || || – ||
|- style="background: 
| 7 || April 5 || Angels || – || || || — || || – ||
|- style="background: 
| 8 || April 7 || @ Guardians || – || || || — || || – ||
|- style="background: 
| 9 || April 8 || @ Guardians || – || || || — || || – ||
|- style="background: 
| 10 || April 9 || @ Guardians || – || || || — || || – ||
|- style="background: 
| 11 || April 10 || @ Cubs || – || || || — || || – ||
|- style="background: 
| 12 || April 11 || @ Cubs || – || || || — || || – ||
|- style="background: 
| 13 || April 12 || @ Cubs || – || || || — || || – ||
|- style="background: 
| 14 || April 14 || Rockies || – || || || — || || – ||
|- style="background: 
| 15 || April 15 || Rockies || – || || || — || || – ||
|- style="background: 
| 16 || April 16 || Rockies || – || || || — || || – ||
|- style="background: 
| 17 || April 17 || Brewers || – || || || — || || – ||
|- style="background: 
| 18 || April 18 || Brewers || – || || || — || || – ||
|- style="background: 
| 19 || April 19 || Brewers || – || || || — || || – ||
|- style="background: 
| 20 || April 21 || Cardinals || – || || || — || || – ||
|- style="background: 
| 21 || April 22 || Cardinals || – || || || — || || – ||
|- style="background: 
| 22 || April 23 || Cardinals || – || || || — || || – ||
|- style="background: 
| 23 || April 25 || @ Phillies || – || || || — || || – ||
|- style="background: 
| 24 || April 26 || @ Phillies || – || || || — || || – ||
|- style="background: 
| 25 || April 27 || @ Phillies || – || || || — || || – ||
|- style="background: 
| 26 || April 28 || @ Blue Jays || – || || || — || || – ||
|- style="background: 
| 27 || April 29 || @ Blue Jays || – || || || — || || – ||
|- style="background: 
| 28 || April 30 || @ Blue Jays || – || || || — || || – ||
|- 
 

|- style="background: 
| 29 || May 2 || @ Athletics || – || || || — || || – ||
|- style="background: 
| 30 || May 3 || @ Athletics || – || || || — || || – ||
|- style="background: 
| 31 || May 4 || @ Athletics || – || || || — || || – ||
|- style="background: 
| 32 || May 5 || Astros || – || || || — || || – ||
|- style="background: 
| 33 || May 6 || Astros || – || || || — || || – ||
|- style="background: 
| 34 || May 7 || Astros || – || || || — || || – ||
|- style="background: 
| 35 || May 8 || Rangers || – || || || — || || – ||
|- style="background: 
| 36 || May 9 || Rangers || – || || || — || || – ||
|- style="background: 
| 37 || May 10 || Rangers || – || || || — || || – ||
|- style="background: 
| 38 || May 12 || @ Tigers || – || || || — || || – ||
|- style="background: 
| 39 || May 13 || @ Tigers || – || || || — || || – ||
|- style="background: 
| 40 || May 14 || @ Tigers || – || || || — || || – ||
|- style="background: 
| 41 || May 15 || @ Red Sox || – || || || — || || – ||
|- style="background: 
| 42 || May 16 || @ Red Sox || – || || || — || || – ||
|- style="background: 
| 43 || May 17 || @ Red Sox || – || || || — || || – ||
|- style="background: 
| 44 || May 19 || @ Braves || – || || || — || || – ||
|- style="background: 
| 45 || May 20 || @ Braves || – || || || — || || – ||
|- style="background: 
| 46 || May 21 || @ Braves || – || || || — || || – ||
|- style="background: 
| 47 || May 22 || Athletics || – || || || — || || – ||
|- style="background: 
| 48 || May 23 || Athletics || – || || || — || || – ||
|- style="background: 
| 49 || May 24 || Athletics || – || || || — || || – ||
|- style="background: 
| 50 || May 25 || Athletics || – || || || — || || – ||
|- style="background: 
| 51 || May 26 || Pirates || – || || || — || || – ||
|- style="background: 
| 52 || May 27 || Pirates || – || || || — || || – ||
|- style="background: 
| 53 || May 28 || Pirates || – || || || — || || – ||
|- style="background: 
| 54 || May 29 || Yankees || – || || || — || || – ||
|- style="background: 
| 55 || May 30 || Yankees || – || || || — || || – ||
|- style="background: 
| 56 || May 31 || Yankees || – || || || — || || – ||
|- 
 

|- style="background: 
| 57 || June 2 || @ Rangers || – || || || — || || – ||
|- style="background: 
| 58 || June 3 || @ Rangers || – || || || — || || – ||
|- style="background: 
| 59 || June 4 || @ Rangers || – || || || — || || – ||
|- style="background: 
| 60 || June 6 || @ Padres || – || || || — || || – ||
|- style="background: 
| 61 || June 7 || @ Padres || – || || || — || || – ||
|- style="background: 
| 62 || June 9 || @ Angels || – || || || — || || – ||
|- style="background: 
| 63 || June 10 || @ Angels || – || || || — || || – ||
|- style="background: 
| 64 || June 11 || @ Angels || – || || || — || || – ||
|- style="background: 
| 65 || June 12 || Marlins || – || || || — || || – ||
|- style="background: 
| 66 || June 13 || Marlins || – || || || — || || – ||
|- style="background: 
| 67 || June 14 || Marlins || – || || || — || || – ||
|- style="background: 
| 68 || June 16 || White Sox || – || || || — || || – ||
|- style="background: 
| 69 || June 17 || White Sox || – || || || — || || – ||
|- style="background: 
| 70 || June 18 || White Sox || – || || || — || || – ||
|- style="background: 
| 71 || June 20 || @ Yankees || – || || || — || || – ||
|- style="background: 
| 72 || June 21 || @ Yankees || – || || || — || || – ||
|- style="background: 
| 73 || June 22 || @ Yankees || – || || || — || || – ||
|- style="background: 
| 74 || June 23 || @ Orioles || – || || || — || || – ||
|- style="background: 
| 75 || June 24 || @ Orioles || – || || || — || || – ||
|- style="background: 
| 76 || June 25 || @ Orioles || – || || || — || || – ||
|- style="background: 
| 77 || June 26 || Nationals || – || || || — || || – ||
|- style="background: 
| 78 || June 27 || Nationals || – || || || — || || – ||
|- style="background: 
| 79 || June 28 || Nationals || – || || || — || || – ||
|- style="background: 
| 80 || June 30 || Rays || – || || || — || || – ||
|- 
 

|- style="background: 
| 81 || July 1 || Rays || – || || || — || || – ||
|- style="background: 
| 82 || July 2 || Rays || – || || || — || || – ||
|- style="background: 
| 83 || July 3 || @ Giants || – || || || — || || – ||
|- style="background: 
| 84 || July 4 || @ Giants || – || || || — || || – ||
|- style="background: 
| 85 || July 5 || @ Giants || – || || || — || || – ||
|- style="background: 
| 86 || July 6 || @ Astros || – || || || — || || – ||
|- style="background: 
| 87 || July 7 || @ Astros || – || || || — || || – ||
|- style="background: 
| 88 || July 8 || @ Astros || – || || || — || || – ||
|- style="background: 
| 89 || July 9 || @ Astros || – || || || — || || – ||
|-style=background:#bbbfff
| – || July 11 || colspan="9"|93rd All-Star Game in Seattle, WA
|- style="background: 
| 90 || July 14 || Tigers || – || || || — || || – ||
|- style="background: 
| 91 || July 15 || Tigers || – || || || — || || – ||
|- style="background: 
| 92 || July 16 || Tigers || – || || || — || || – ||
|- style="background: 
| 93 || July 17 || Twins || – || || || — || || – ||
|- style="background: 
| 94 || July 18 || Twins || – || || || — || || – ||
|- style="background: 
| 95 || July 19 || Twins || – || || || — || || – ||
|- style="background: 
| 96 || July 20 || Twins || – || || || — || || – ||
|- style="background: 
| 97 || July 21 || Blue Jays || – || || || — || || – ||
|- style="background: 
| 98 || July 22 || Blue Jays || – || || || — || || – ||
|- style="background: 
| 99 || July 23 || Blue Jays || – || || || — || || – ||
|- style="background: 
| 100 || July 24 || @ Twins || – || || || — || || – ||
|- style="background: 
| 101 || July 25 || @ Twins || – || || || — || || – ||
|- style="background: 
| 102 || July 26 || @ Twins || – || || || — || || – ||
|- style="background: 
| 103 || July 28 || @ Diamondbacks || – || || || — || || – ||
|- style="background: 
| 104 || July 29 || @ Diamondbacks || – || || || — || || – ||
|- style="background: 
| 105 || July 30 || @ Diamondbacks || – || || || — || || – ||
|- style="background: 
| 106 || July 31 || Red Sox || – || || || — || || – ||
|- 
 

|- style="background: 
| 107 || August 1 || Red Sox || – || || || — || || – ||
|- style="background: 
| 108 || August 2 || Red Sox || – || || || — || || – ||
|- style="background: 
| 109 || August 3 || @ Angels || – || || || — || || – ||
|- style="background: 
| 110 || August 4 || @ Angels || – || || || — || || – ||
|- style="background: 
| 111 || August 5 || @ Angels || – || || || — || || – ||
|- style="background: 
| 112 || August 6 || @ Angels || – || || || — || || – ||
|- style="background: 
| 113 || August 8 || Padres || – || || || — || || – ||
|- style="background: 
| 114 || August 9 || Padres || – || || || — || || – ||
|- style="background: 
| 115 || August 11 || Orioles || – || || || — || || – ||
|- style="background: 
| 116 || August 12 || Orioles || – || || || — || || – ||
|- style="background: 
| 117 || August 13 || Orioles || – || || || — || || – ||
|- style="background: 
| 118 || August 14 || @ Royals || – || || || — || || – ||
|- style="background: 
| 119 || August 15 || @ Royals || – || || || — || || – ||
|- style="background: 
| 120 || August 16 || @ Royals || – || || || — || || – ||
|- style="background: 
| 121 || August 17 || @ Royals || – || || || — || || – ||
|- style="background: 
| 122 || August 18 || @ Astros || – || || || — || || – ||
|- style="background: 
| 123 || August 19 || @ Astros || – || || || — || || – ||
|- style="background: 
| 124 || August 20 || @ Astros || – || || || — || || – ||
|- style="background: 
| 125 || August 21 || @ White Sox || – || || || — || || – ||
|- style="background: 
| 126 || August 22 || @ White Sox || – || || || — || || – ||
|- style="background: 
| 127 || August 23 || @ White Sox || – || || || — || || – ||
|- style="background: 
| 128 || August 25 || Royals || – || || || — || || – ||
|- style="background: 
| 129 || August 26 || Royals || – || || || — || || – ||
|- style="background: 
| 130 || August 27 || Royals || – || || || — || || – ||
|- style="background: 
| 131 || August 28 || Athletics || – || || || — || || – ||
|- style="background: 
| 132 || August 29 || Athletics || – || || || — || || – ||
|- style="background: 
| 133 || August 30 || Athletics || – || || || — || || – ||
|- 
 

|- style="background: 
| 134 || September 1 || @ Mets || – || || || — || || – ||
|- style="background: 
| 135 || September 2 || @ Mets || – || || || — || || – ||
|- style="background: 
| 136 || September 3 || @ Mets || – || || || — || || – ||
|- style="background: 
| 137 || September 4 || @ Reds || – || || || — || || – ||
|- style="background: 
| 138 || September 5 || @ Reds || – || || || — || || – ||
|- style="background: 
| 139 || September 6 || @ Reds || – || || || — || || – ||
|- style="background: 
| 140 || September 7 || @ Rays || – || || || — || || – ||
|- style="background: 
| 141 || September 8 || @ Rays || – || || || — || || – ||
|- style="background: 
| 142 || September 9 || @ Rays || – || || || — || || – ||
|- style="background: 
| 143 || September 10 || @ Rays || – || || || — || || – ||
|- style="background: 
| 144 || September 11 || Angels || – || || || — || || – ||
|- style="background: 
| 145 || September 12 || Angels || – || || || — || || – ||
|- style="background: 
| 146 || September 13 || Angels || – || || || — || || – ||
|- style="background: 
| 147 || September 15 || Dodgers || – || || || — || || – ||
|- style="background: 
| 148 || September 16 || Dodgers || – || || || — || || – ||
|- style="background: 
| 149 || September 17 || Dodgers || – || || || — || || – ||
|- style="background: 
| 150 || September 18 || @ Athletics || – || || || — || || – ||
|- style="background: 
| 151 || September 19 || @ Athletics || – || || || — || || – ||
|- style="background: 
| 152 || September 20 || @ Athletics || – || || || — || || – ||
|- style="background: 
| 153 || September 22 || @ Rangers || – || || || — || || – ||
|- style="background: 
| 154 || September 23 || @ Rangers || – || || || — || || – ||
|- style="background: 
| 155 || September 24 || @ Rangers || – || || || — || || – ||
|- style="background: 
| 156 || September 25 || Astros || – || || || — || || – ||
|- style="background: 
| 157 || September 26 || Astros || – || || || — || || – ||
|- style="background: 
| 158 || September 27 || Astros || – || || || — || || – ||
|- style="background: 
| 159 || September 28 || Rangers || – || || || — || || – ||
|- style="background: 
| 160 || September 29 || Rangers || – || || || — || || – ||
|- style="background: 
| 161 || September 30 || Rangers || – || || || — || || – ||
|- style="background: 
| 162 || October 1 || Rangers || – || || || — || || – ||
|-

Season standings

American League West

American League Wild Card

Roster

Farm system

References

External links

2023 Seattle Mariners season at Baseball Reference

Seattle Mariners seasons
Seattle Mariners season